Overhead microphones are those used in sound recording and live sound reproduction to pick up ambient sounds, transients and the overall blend of instruments. They are used in drum recording to achieve a stereo image of the full drum kit, as well as orchestral recording to create a balanced stereo recording of full orchestras.

Overhead positioning 
There are multiple arrangements for drum overheads, which are often based on personal preference of the musician, engineer, or producer. These include "A-B" spaced pairs (where two directional microphones are suspended above the left and right clusters of cymbals), "X-Y" coincident pairs, where the two directional microphones are centred on the drum kit with their capsule are very close without touching, and angled across each other at 90°. Coincident placement give a wider stereo image than spaced pairs, and some engineers prefer it for this reason.

Other drum overhead positions include the Recorderman Technique (where the distance between both microphones and the snare drum is equal, as is the distance between both microphones and the bass drum) and Glyn Johns' method (where one "overhead" is placed to the drummer's right, aiming across the floor tom to the centre of the kit).

In orchestral recordings, particularly those for film score recordings, the Decca tree is often used.

Footnotes

Sources 

 
 
 
 
 
 

Sound recording
Microphones